Presidential elections were held in Burkina Faso on 21 November 2010. Incumbent president Blaise Compaoré was re-elected with 80% of the vote. The elections were marred by claims of widespread fraud.

Candidates
A total of seven candidates registered to contest the elections, including three who contested the 2005 elections. Incumbent President Blaise Compaoré ran as the candidate of the Congress for Democracy and Progress, and was also supported by the Alliance for Democracy and Federation – African Democratic Rally. Bénéwendé Stanislas Sankara, the runner-up in 2005 was the candidate of the Union for Rebirth / Sankarist Movement. Pargui Emile Pare, who finished tenth in 2005, ran as the People's Movement for Socialism / Federal Party candidate.

Former Army commander Boukary Kaboré was the Pan-African Sankarist Union / Progressive Movement candidate, and was backed by the National Council for Renaissance-Sankarist Movement and the Party for National Unity and Development. Former Foreign Minister Hama Arba Diallo was nominated by the Party for Democracy and Socialism, and also received the support of the African Independence Party, the Social Forces Front, Faso Metba, the Citizens League of Builders, the Union for Democracy and Social Progress and the Union of Progressive Forces.

Hydrogeologist Ouampoussoga Francois Kaboré ran as the Party for Democracy and Progress / Socialist Party candidate, whilst Maxime Kaboré stood as an independent.

Results

References

Presidential elections in Burkina Faso
Burkina Faso
2010 in Burkina Faso